Robert Wolfe (1921–2014) was a senior archivist of the US National Archives and expert on captured German war documents.

Robert Wolfe may also refer to:

 Bob Wolfe (American football) (born 1946), head football coach
 Robert M. Wolfe (died 1940), last mayor of South Norwalk, Connecticut (1909–1910 and 1912–1913)
 Robert Hewitt Wolfe (born 1964), American television producer and scriptwriter
 Robert F. Wolfe (died 1927), newspaper founder
 Robert L. Wolfe (1928–1981), American film editor

See also
Robert Wolff (disambiguation)
Robert Wolf (disambiguation)